The Punjab Warriors  are a Pakistani rugby team. They play in the Pakistan Super XV League and serve as a Punjab select side under the jurisdiction of the Punjab Rugby Association. Presumably this team does not include players from Lahore RFC, as that club functions independently.

History
Pakistan Warriors was founded in 2011 Abdul Rahim Khan. They squared off against powerhouses Lahore RFC in the Pakistan Super XV League played as part of the Azadi Cup, losing 5-20. In January 2012 they faced the Indian side Delhi Shers (formerly known as the Delhi Lions) who were on tour in Pakistan.

References

External links
Punjab Rugby Association

Pakistani rugby union teams